Cantonale elections to renew canton general councillors were held in France on 8 and 15 March 1970.

Electoral system

The cantonales elections use the same system as the regional or legislative elections. There is a 10% threshold (10% of registered voters) needed to proceed to the second round.

National results

Runoff results missing

Sources

Alain Lancelot, Les élections sous la Ve République, PUF, Paris, 1988

1970
1970 elections in France